The Verdict is a street album by American rapper The Jacka released in 2012 and is the second of a tetralogy of albums, starting with The Indictment and ending with The Appeal.

Critical reception
Allmusic gave the album gave the album 3.5/5 stars.

Track listing

References

2012 albums
The Jacka albums